Takale Tuna (born 17 January 1965) is a Papua New Guinean sprinter. He competed in the men's 200 metres at the 1988 Summer Olympics.

Tuna has been described as "one of PNG's most successful ever athletes". His son Tovetina Tuna is also a sprinter.

References

External links
 

1965 births
Living people
Athletes (track and field) at the 1988 Summer Olympics
Papua New Guinean male sprinters
Olympic athletes of Papua New Guinea
Athletes (track and field) at the 1990 Commonwealth Games
Commonwealth Games competitors for Papua New Guinea
Place of birth missing (living people)